The third season of The Boulet Brothers' Dragula premiered on August 27, 2019, and concluded on October 28, 2019. The competition was broadcast on Amazon Prime in the United States, Canada, Australia and the United Kingdom, OutTV in Canada and Netflix in the United States. The series featured 11 contestants, including a drag king and a AFAB drag artist, competing for the title of World's Next Drag Super-Monster and a cash prize of $25,000.

On December 5, 2017, OutTV and Boulet Brothers Productions announced that the third season had been greenlit. The Boulet Brothers announced via Twitter on February 23, 2018, that casting would be starting soon and used the hashtag "Season of the Witch". Casting began on March 7, 2018 and finished twenty-one days later on March 28, 2018. The story producer is writer Clint Catalyst.

The winner of the third season of The Boulet Brothers' Dragula was Landon Cider, with Dollya Black and Priscilla Chambers as the runner-up. Priscilla Chambers and St. Lucia (now referred to simply as Saint) returned later to compete in The Boulet Brothers' Dragula: Resurrection, a competition between contestants from previous seasons of Dragula, with the winner returning for the fourth season of Dragula. Saint won the competition, earned a place as a contestant on season 4, and a cash price of $20,000.

Contestants

Contestant progress
Legend:

Exterminations
Legend:

Notes:

Guest judges

Episode summary

References

2019 in LGBT history
2019 television seasons
The Boulet Brothers' Dragula